Seeing Anthropology: Cultural Anthropology Through Film by Karl G. Heider introduces cultural anthropology with the use of both text and audiovisual media. First published in 1997, the work uses the tools of the ethnographic film discipline to inform its audience of the various cultural anthropology topics.  Also, the text covers 14 different cultures in 17 chapters, which are also represented in 21 different short film clips ranging from two to twelve minutes.

References

Anthropology books
Anthropology documentary films
Cultural anthropology
Area studies
Ethnic studies
Ethnography
1997 non-fiction books